Brachionopus robustus, also known by its common name robust lesser baboon spider, is a species from the genus Brachionopus. The species was originally described by Reginald Innes Pocock in 1897.

References

Spiders of South Africa
Taxa named by R. I. Pocock
Theraphosidae